Ips calligraphus, known generally as coarsewriting engraver, is a species of typical bark beetle in the family Curculionidae. Other common names include the six-spined engraver beetle and six-spined ips. It is found in North America.

References

Further reading

External links

 

Scolytinae
Articles created by Qbugbot